Anita Nancy Bernstein is an American tort law scholar, with expertise in feminist jurisprudence and legal ethics. She is the Anita and Stuart Subotnick Professor of Law at Brooklyn Law School.

Biography
Bernstein graduated from Queens College with a Bachelor of Arts degree in Political Science and a Juris Doctor from Yale Law School. She served as an article and book review editor of the Yale Law Journal.

Following law school, she clerked for Jack B. Weinstein, who was then Chief Judge of the United States District Court for the Eastern District of New York. She then worked for Debevoise & Plimpton.

Bernstein was the first law professor to receive the Fulbright Scholarship in European Union affairs. Her writings have appeared in Harvard Law Review, Yale Law Journal, Columbia Law Review, California Law Review, Michigan Law Review, Cornell Law Review, Duke Law Journal, Texas Law Review, and Vanderbilt Law Review. She has authored several books that address torts, products liability, and the law of marriage.

Bernstein's scholarship has been cited in decisional law by both trial and appellate federal courts, including the Supreme Court of Pennsylvania and the Supreme Court of Texas: Butler v. Ysleta Indep. Sch. Dist., Lance v. Wyeth, LAN/STV v. Martin K. Eby Constr. Co., G.M.M. v. Kimpson, Johnson v. Smithkline Beecham Corp., and In re Titanium Dioxide Antitrust Litig.,

She has also authored a series on legal malpractice in the New York Law Journal.

Bernstein was the first holder of an ethics chair at Emory University School of Law. She blogs occasionally on legal ethics and professional responsibility.

The National Constitution Center hosted Bernstein on December 15, 2017 for at a panel on the future of free speech in the age of social media, and at a March 18, 2019 panel about free speech on campus.

Bernstein is the author of The Common Law Inside the Female Body, published by Cambridge University Press. In this book, Bernstein argues that traditional common law principles justify the right and liberty to refuse sexual penetration and pregnancy when those experiences are unwanted.

Academia 

Anita and Stuart Subotnick Professor of Law Brooklyn Law School 2007–Present 
Sam Nunn Professor of Law Emory University School of Law 2000-2007
Professor of Law Chicago-Kent College of Law 1989-1999
Visiting Professor: McGill University Faculty of Law (2017), Australian National University and University of Sydney (2009), New York Law School (2004, 2005-2007), Cornell Law School (2003), Mason Ladd Distinguished Visiting Professor University of Iowa College of Law (2002), Emory University School of Law (1999-2000), University of Michigan Law School (1998–99)

Recognition 
Willam L. Prosser Award, Section on Torts and Compensation Systems, American Association of Law Schools (2020)
Fulbright Program Law Research Scholar (1992–93)
Jean Monnet fellow at the European University Institute (1992–93)
Associate Member of the Common Room and an Honorary Member of the Table of Christ Church College at the University of Oxford (2015).

Notable publications 

Keep It Simple: An Explanation of the Rule of No Recovery for Pure Economic Loss, Arizona Law Review 773 (2006)
What’s Wrong with Stereotyping?, Arizona Law Review 655 (2013)
Common Law Fundamentals of the Right to Abortion, 63 Buffalo Law Review (2015)
Pitfalls Ahead: A Manifesto for the Training of Lawyers, 94 Cornell Law Review 479 (2009), 
Treating Sexual Harassment with Respect, 111 Harvard Law Review 445 (1997)
The Trouble with Regulating Microfinance, 35 U. Hawai’i Law Review 1 (2013)
Whatever Happened to Law and Economics?, 64 Maryland Law Review 303 (2005)
For and Against Marriage: A Revision, 102 Michigan Law Review 129 (2003)
Toward More Parsimony and Transparency for "the Essentials of Marriage," 2011 Michigan State Law Review 83 (2011)
Real Remedies for Virtual Injuries, 90 North Carolina Law Review 1457 (2012) 
Abuse and Harassment Diminish Free Speech, 35 Pace Law Review 1 (2014)

Poetry 

Poetry is among Bernstein's interests. Atlanta Review, Oxford Poetry, Minnesota Review, The New Renaissance, Orbis, and Bird's Thumb have published her poems. In 2016 she taught a poetry workshop at Brooklyn Lifelong Learning.

References 

1961 births
Living people
Queens College, City University of New York alumni
Yale Law School alumni
American legal scholars
Brooklyn Law School faculty
People associated with Debevoise & Plimpton
Emory University School of Law faculty